John Whaite (born 23 May 1989) is an English baker who won the third series of The Great British Bake Off in 2012.  He works as a chef, television presenter, and author.

Early life
John Whaite was born in Chorley, Lancashire, and grew up on a farm in Wrightington. He has two sisters, Jane and Victoria. He became interested in baking at the age of seven, after his parents divorced. He won a place at Oxford to read Modern and Medieval Languages, but switched to study Law at the University of Manchester to be nearer to home. In 2012 he gained a first-class degree after sitting for his law exams while filming Bake Off. He also  completed a summer scheme with top law firm Eversheds Sutherland and worked briefly as a banker in the Royal Bank of Scotland's asset finance department. He rejected a career in law or banking after winning the series, and took classes at Le Cordon Bleu in London to pursue a career in cooking.

Career

Television
In 2012, Whaite took part in the third series of The Great British Bake Off on BBC Two. During the sixth episode of the series Whaite sustained a major injury to his finger and could not complete the last bake. After making it through to the final, he won the show with his Italian sausage and roasted vegetable pithivier, fondant fancies, and heaven and hell chiffon cake. Despite winning the series, he won "Star Baker" only once.

Whaite has appeared as a resident chef on the ITV breakfast programme Lorraine, hosted by Lorraine Kelly. He has also appeared on This Morning, What's Cooking?, The Alan Titchmarsh Show and Sunday Brunch as a guest chef.

In April 2016, Whaite began co-presenting Chopping Block, ITV's new daytime cookery competitive show with Rosemary Shrager where four couples compete in a series of daily challenges to win a prize. A second series began airing in March 2017.

Whaite makes regular appearances, as one of its chefs, with presenter Steph McGovern on her Channel 4 daytime show Steph's Packed Lunch.

In August 2021, Whaite was announced as a contestant on the nineteenth series of Strictly Come Dancing. He was paired with professional Johannes Radebe, and they became the first ever male same-sex pairing on the show. They reached the final as one of the last two couples, but were beaten by Rose Ayling-Ellis and her partner Giovanni Pernice.

Cookery
After appearing on Bake Off, Whaite studied for a Diplôme de Pâtisserie at Le Cordon Bleu, London.

In 2015, John Whaite's kitchen cookery school, named John Whaite's Kitchen, opened in a converted 400-year-old cattle shed on his family's farm on Tunley Lane in Wrightington, Lancashire. As of December 2021, this project remains closed.

Writing
Whaite has released four cookery books. His first, John Whaite Bakes, was released on 25 April 2013, and the second, John Whaite Bakes at Home, was released on 27 March 2014. The third book, Perfect Plates in 5 Ingredients, was published in April 2016. The fourth book, Comfort: Food to soothe the soul, was published in October 2017. In 2019, he wrote A Flash in the Pan, which contains recipes for cooking using only a stovetop pan.

Whaite wrote a column on food for The Daily Telegraph. He briefly wrote the column "Hot John" for Heat magazine in 2013.

Theatre 
Whaite performed in Strictly Come Dancing – the Live Tour 2022. In May 2022 it was revealed Whaite was due to join the cast of the Andrew Lloyd-Webber musical Cinderella as Prince Charming; however, the production posted a closing notice before he could make his debut. Whaite expressed that joining the cast of Cinderella would have been a "dream come true".

Personal life
Whaite lives in Leeds with his partner Paul Atkins, a graphic designer. He announced their engagement on 21 July 2017.

Whaite said he has suffered from depression. He also said he has experienced bulimia in the past.

In 2019, Whaite worked on a  farm in the mountains of British Columbia, Canada, which he found via the World-wide Opportunities on Organic Farms website.

Publications
 John Whaite Bakes (2013)
 John Whaite Bakes at Home (2014)
 Perfect Plates in 5 Ingredients (2016)
 Comfort: Food to Soothe the Soul (2018)
 A Flash in the Pan (2019)

References

External links

 

Living people
English chefs
English food writers
British gay writers
The Great British Bake Off contestants
English LGBT writers
Alumni of the University of Manchester
Alumni of Le Cordon Bleu
1989 births
LGBT chefs